E. crispa may refer to:
 Ericameria crispa, a shrub species in the genus Ericameria
 Euclea crispa, a flowering plant species in the genus Euclea
 Euphorbia crispa, a noticeably succulent plant species in the genus Euphorbia

See also
 Crispa (disambiguation)